Podhorany is a village and municipality in the Nitra District in western central Slovakia, in the Nitra Region.

History
In historical records the village was first mentioned in 1113.

Geography
The village lies at an altitude of 190 metres and covers an area of 17.707 km2. It has a population of about 1062 people.

Ethnicity
The population is about 90% Slovak, 8% Magyar with Czech and other minority populations.

References

External links
http://www.statistics.sk/mosmis/eng/run.html

ir:Podhorany (Nitra)

Villages and municipalities in Nitra District